John Hamilton Constable (born 22 July 1952) is an English playwright, poet, performer and activist, author of The Southwark Mysteries. He is also known as John Crow, the urban shaman of Cross Bones.

Life
Constable was born in Much Wenlock, Shropshire in 1952. He was educated at Oswestry School (1963–69) and Queens' College, Cambridge (1970–73). In the mid-1970s, he performed at David Medalla's Artists For Democracy. From 1977-79, he lived in Japan and travelled widely in the Far East, and from 1980–82, toured Europe with the street theatre group Sheer Madness, playing Hamlet in the devised show Shakespeare’s Greatest Hits. From 1984, following the production of Black Mas by Foco Novo he returned to live in London. His plays included The Fit Up, Tulip Futures, Iceman and The False Hairpiece. He also wrote children's plays, radio dramas, and dramatisations of Gormenghast and The Mosquito Coast for the David Glass Ensemble.

In 1986 he moved to The Borough, in Southwark, then a poor and much maligned part of south London. The area had a profound influence on his work, which draws freely on its 2,000 year history and the far-reaching changes that saw it reinvented as prime real estate in the heart of London. In Sicily in 1994 he met his companion Katharine Nicholls, a craftworker and community outreach worker. In their activism and esoteric work at Crossbones and with outsiders, she also became known as Katy Kaos. One of the poems in The Southwark Mysteries is entitled kateEkaos. She stage-managed his solo shows and site-specific events, co-produced the epic productions of The Southwark Mysteries and created the original “Hand-Maid” limited edition of The Book of The Goose.

In 1995 he wrote and performed a solo show I Was An Alien Sex God. This inaugurated a new phase of experimental writing which produced his best-known work, The Southwark Mysteries. These began in 1996 as a cycle of mystical poems revealed to his shamanistic alter-ego, John Crow, by “The Goose”, who claimed to have been buried in the unconsecrated Cross Bones Graveyard. The Winchester Geese were medieval sex workers in the Bankside brothels licensed by the Bishop of Winchester under Ordinances dating back to 1161. The Southwark Mysteries grew from a poem cycle to a contemporary mystery play, first performed in Shakespeare's Globe and Southwark Cathedral on 23 April 2000.

From 2004 to 2012 he was artistic director of the community arts group Southwark Mysteries, conducting guided walks, workshops and site-specific performances inspired by the work. The Halloween of Cross Bones, conducted annually from 1998 to 2010, ended with a candle-lit procession to the gates of Crossbones, the outcasts' burial ground. He led a long campaign to protect the burial ground and to establish a garden of remembrance on the site. A new production of The Southwark Mysteries was staged in Southwark Cathedral in 2010.

In November 2010 John Constable was awarded an Honorary Fellowship of London South Bank University for services to the arts and community: “… for his vision and imagination, for his deep commitment to our local area, for his work in reclaiming lost histories and, above all, for his belief in the transformative power of writing and drama...
At Southwark's Civic Award Ceremony in May 2011, he received The Liberty of the Old Metropolitan Borough of Southwark.
In recognition of his work at Crossbones, and for the human rights of sex workers and other outsiders, Constable was named Campaigner of the Year at the 2011 Erotic Awards. His Sha-Manic Plays,  Gormenghast, The Southwark Mysteries and Secret Bankside – Walks In The Outlaw Borough are published by Oberon Books. In 2014 Thin Man Press published Spark In The Dark, his first collection of poetry

Plays
John Constable's first play, Black Mas, was inspired by a visit to the Trinidad Carnival in 1982.  It explores the adventures of two white British musicians visiting Trinidad for fresh inspiration and getting out of their depth under the heady influence of Carnival.  The Guardian'''s Robin Thornber wrote: "It's a powerful piece that works on many levels, using the exotic trappings of its setting to cast its spell, but probing incessantly into the murky depths of racial and sexual mythology."  The play, directed by Roland Rees for Foco Novo, opened at the New End Theatre, Hampstead followed by a UK tour.  Other early work includes The Fit Up (Nuffield Theatre Southampton) and The Complete Casanova (Proteus-Horshoe Theatre, Croydon Warehouse).  He was commissioned by RADA to write Hot Fondue, a contemporary play loosely based on Schnitzler's La Ronde, directed by Roland Rees14.

In the 1990s, having worked with physical theatre director David Glass on the devised show Bozo's Dead, he was commissioned to write the stage adaptation of Gormenghast for the David Glass Ensemble.  His 1994 play Tulip Futures concerned Tulip mania, the seventeenth century speculation on tulips which nearly bankrupt the Dutch economy.  Tulip Futures was nominated for the Peggy Ramsay Award.Iceman is a black comedy about the war on drugs: an undercover policeman gets so deep into his cover, he winds up busting himself. It was short-listed for the Verity Bargate Award and produced by Brute Farce at the White Bear Theatre, Kennington.

In 1995, Constable wrote and performed I Was an Alien Sex God, directed by Di Sherlock.  The show opened in London at Battersea Arts Centre, followed by a popular and critically acclaimed run on the Edinburgh Fringe.  Ian Shuttleworth's review began by quoting its most memorable line: '... "Let's get this straight, Commissioner - you're saying that if David Bowie and I have sex, it'll destroy the universe?"  John Constable fully exploits his passing resemblance to the Thin White Duke in his mind-blowingly weird one-man show which takes in acid trips, mind-body transference, quantum physics, Berlin gay clubs and the end of the world as we know it.'

Constable's subsequent work seems intent on dissolving the lines between art and life.  In the introduction to Sha-Manic Plays, he acknowledged John Crow as a literary persona appearing in his work in various guises.  In his next work, John Crow took on a life of his own.  According to Constable, The Southwark Mysteries was "revealed by The Goose to John Crow at Crossbones... on the night of the 23rd November 1996.  My shamanic double had somehow raised the Spirit of a medieval Whore, licensed by a Bishop, yet allegedly denied Christian burial."  In The Book of The Constable, one of the poems of The Southwark Mysteries, 'The Goose and the Crow' seem to prophesy the chain of coincidences that  lead Constable to write a contemporary mystery play with the support of the Very Rev'd Colin Slee, Dean of Southwark Cathedral, and the actor Mark Rylance, then artistic director of Shakespeare's Globe.  In the play, Jesus ('The Son of Man in the street') returns to Southwark to save its lost souls, the heretic John Crow, and The Goose in the guise of Mary Magdalene.  The play premièred in Shakespeare's Globe – with the climactic Harrowing of Hell scene staged in Southwark Cathedral – on Easter Sunday, 23 April 2000.  The Dean defended the performance of this controversial work in the Cathedral.  A headline in The Sunday Telegraph read: 'Dean rejects critics of Southwark's "swearing Jesus" Mystery Play'.

Selected texts from The Southwark Mysteries featured in his site-specific ritual dramas - The Anatomy Class (The Old Operating Theatre), The Goose At Liberty (Southwark Playhouse), The Halloween of Cross Bones, conducted annually from 1998 to 2010, which culminated at the gates of the former burial ground.

Constable's later work similarly drew on the history and contemporary culture of his south London neighbourhood.  He wrote the libretto for South of the River, the ENO community opera performed in a big top in Potters Fields.

In 2013, he wrote a one-man show Spare - inspired by the life and work of the south London artist and magician Austin Osman Spare – which he performed in Treadwell's Bookshop and in the White Bear Theatre, Kennington, where Spare himself used to drink and had once exhibited his paintings.

Poetry
The first part of The Southwark Mysteries comprises a cycle of mystical poems, seven Vision Books in which The Goose initiates John Crow into her “Secret History” and “Mysteries”. These two literary personas guide the reader on a journey through 2,000 years of Southwark's history, reimagined through the eyes of outcasts and outsiders. The verses range freely, from archaic ballad form to contemporary rap..The Glossolalia asserts that these are magical texts, including “The Goose's Heresy”, an “Hermetic tradition passed down by Bankside actors and whores”.

In the lead-up to the millennium, Constable performed poetry and ritual dramas at The Warp, a series of fortnightly 24-hour parties in the caverns under London Bridge. In the first decade of the 21st century, he appeared, often as John Crow, in theatres, clubs and festivals worldwide. He hosted The Palace of Wisdom, an all-night poetry tent at the Glastonbury Festival, where he was a regular performer in the legendary underground Irish Piano Bar.

In 2014, Spark In The Dark was published by Thin Man Press. This first collection of Constable's poetry ranges from satirical Burlesques to lyrical Spirit Songs. In Mrs God the poet draws on his Welsh Borders upbringing in a “burlesque” that comically subverts the image of a Divine patriarch. The book also features two experimental prose-poems. Winchester Cathedral:Time Out Of Mind, written during an Arts Council residency at Winchester Cathedral, evokes the misadventures of a medieval monk troubled by visions of the future. Wennefer is “a cautionary tale”, a visceral retelling of the Isis-Osiris myth set in south London club culture.

Songs
Songs from The Southwark Mysteries with music by Richard Kilgour featured in the 2000 and 2010 stage productions. Others, with music by Niall McDevitt, were performed at The Halloween of Crossbones. Constable subsequently wrote a number of his own songs - released on goose & crow : spirit songs, featuring Nigel Hoyle and Katy Carr.  On the Gemini City album, Nigel of Bermondsey covered his song The Green Man Is Come. His texts for Beltane, Lammas and Samhain featured on the MegaT album with music by Universal Mind Sound System. His poems Spark In the Dark and I Am The Wind featured on Hawklords' 2012 album We Are One. He also contributed lyrics for songs on Hawklords' next two albums -  White Rag on Dream, and Damned on Censored.

Radio, television and film
Constable wrote Undesirable Activities for the BBC drama series Black Silk. He adapted the John Wyndham novels The Kraken Wakes and Chocky for BBC Radio 4 - subsequently released on DVD in the BBC Classic Radio Sci-Fi series. He has been interviewed many times on the radio about his literary work and appears in many films about the work at Crossbones. In the lead-up to the 2010 production of The Southwark Mysteries he and the Dean of Southwark Cathedral were interviewed on the BBCs Songs of Praise.

Children's plays and workshops
In 1987, for Proteus Theatre Company, Constable devised Forgotten But Not Gone for actors with learning difficulties. He was artistic director of the company during 1989. In the 1990s, he wrote many children's plays for Proteus, including adaptations of Maeterlinck's The Bluebird, Thackeray's The Rose and The Ring, Dickens' A Christmas Carol, Rumpelstiltskin and The Emperor's New Clothes. As artistic director of the community arts group, Southwark Mysteries, he conducted children's workshops in schools and community centres. His popular workshops included the Our Place and Our Story programmes, which used local history and cultural identity as springboards for the participants' own devised work. His George And The Dragon workshops, first performed in schools in south London, were taken to Cumbria as part of an anti-racist programme. In 2014, he was the dramaturg for Half Moon Young People's Theatre's #LimehouseLandmark programme, featuring devised performances inspired by the history of their building in Limehouse.

Walks, talks and activism
Since 1998, Constable has conducted guided walks around his Borough and Bankside neighbourhood. In 2007, Oberon Books published Secret Bankside – Walks In The Outlaw Borough, a collection of his walks exploring alternative histories of the area. He has been commissioned every year since 2003 to create unusual themed walks for the City of London Festival.  He has given talks for groups as diverse as Southwark Council, The Moot With No Name, South East London Folklore Society, Radical Anthropology Group and The Salon For The City.

He is the patron of REWRITE, a Southwark-based charity bringing together young people from different backgrounds to fight prejudice and injustice through the power of drama and creative writing. He championed community involvement and local identity in the face of the redevelopment of The Borough and wrote a scathing report on the MIPIM Global Property Fair in Cannes. A long-standing advocate of decriminilisation, he strongly criticised the “War On Drugs”, and supported the Sexual Freedom Coalition (SFC)'s campaign for sexual freedom between consenting adults. He performed his poetry at the SFC's 1998 “Sex Symposium” and escorted Dr Tuppy Owens to present their petition at No 10 Downing Street.

Since 1998, he has led a campaign by “Friends of Crossbones” to protect the site of the Crossbones burial ground and to establish a garden of remembrance on the site. He and Katharine Nicholls curate a shrine to “the outcast dead” at the gates in Redcross Way, to which hundreds of people have contributed mementos. He performed The Halloween of Crossbones every year from 1998 to 2010, and has led vigils at the gates on the 23rd of every month since June 2004. Having raised public awareness of Crossbones' historic and cultural importance, he lobbied the site owners Transport for London (TfL) to open a public garden there. 2014 marked an important new phase in this work, when TfL granted a lease for a 'meanwhile garden' to Bankside Open Spaces Trust (BOST).

Urban shamanism, magic and mysticism
Beginning in 1998 Constable began conducting The Halloween of Crossbones and other ritual dramas. In this capacity he himself became widely known as John Crow, the south London shaman who channels The Goose, the spirit of a medieval prostitute he encountered at Cross Bones cemetery. Constable's work is inherently syncretic.

In the Glossolalia he states that shamanism is not a fixed belief-system. The Southwark Mysteries explicitly honour the poetic “Spirit” above “the letter of the law”, art over religion, “Liberty” as a spiritual state in which contrary energies find creative expression. His essay Transgressive Shamanism considers how the West has appropriated the practices of indigenous shamans, especially relating to the use of psychoactive sacraments. It charts the transgressive use of such substances by artists, suggesting alternative “lines of transmission” in art. His Shamanic Playhouse workshops explore other ways of effecting altered mind-states. He speaks of “repatterning reality” and of the associations of the number 23 with “revelation and transformation”.

Interviewed about his 2013 play, Spare, Constable expresses a sense of kinship with the south London artist and magician Austin Osman Spare and his intuitive approach to magic.

The 2014 poetry book 'Spark In The Dark' is prefaced by Blake's epigram: “Without Contraries is no progression” - and this idea is implicit in many of the poems. The last part of the book, Spirit Songs'', draws freely on British traditions like the Queen of the May at Beltane. By contrast, the final poem Queen of the Moon ('Queen of the vision revealed in the vine / And the leaves of the Shining Tree...') evokes the Brazilian Santo Daime tradition.

List of works

Plays
 Black Mas 1984 Foco Novo tour, New End Theatre Hampstead and Albany Theatre Deptford
 The Fit Up 1988 Nuffield Theatre Southampton
 The Complete Casanova 1991 Proteus-Horseshoe Theatre Company, Croydon Warehouse
 Hot Fondue 1992 RADA
 Tulip Futures 1994 Soho Theatre Company
 Dead Man's Handle 1994 Soho Theatre Company
 Iceman 1997 Brute Farce, White Bear Kennington
 The False Hairpiece 1997 Proteus Theatre Company, Southwark Playhouse
 The Goose At Liberty 2000 Southwark Playhouse
 The Southwark Mysteries 2000, 2010 Shakespeare's Globe and Southwark Cathedral

Solo shows
 I Was An Alien Sex God 1995 Edinburgh Festival, BAC and Grahamstown Festival (SA)
 Raingods Become Me 2002 BAC
 Spare 2013 Treadwells and White Bear Theatre, Kennington

Stage adaptations
 A Christmas Carol 1986 Proteus Theatre Company
 The Bluebird 1988 Proteus Theatre Company
 The Rose and The Ring 1990 Proteus Theatre Company
 Rumpelstiltskin 1991 Proteus Theatre Company
 The Emperor's New Clothes 1992 Proteus Theatre Company
 Gormenghast 1992 David Glass Ensemble
 The Mosquito Coast 1994 David Glass Ensemble

Devised work
 Forgotten But Not Gone 1987 Proteus Theatre Company
 Bozo's Dead 1991 David Glass Ensemble
 South of the River 2002 libretto for English National Opera community opera

Books
 Sha-Manic Plays (Black Mas, Dead Man's Handle, Iceman,The False Hairpiece) 1997 Oberon Books
 The Southwark Mysteries 1999 Oberon Books
 Gormenghast 2006 Oberon Books
 Secret Bankside – Walks In The Outcast Borough 2007 Oberon Books
 Spark In The Dark 2014 Thin Man Press

References

1952 births
Living people
Writers from Shropshire
People educated at Oswestry School
Alumni of Queens' College, Cambridge
20th-century English poets
English male poets
20th-century English male writers